Milad Abtahi (born January 8, 1992) is an Iranian football forward who currently plays for Iranian football club Saba Qom in the Iran Pro League.

References

1992 births
Living people
Iranian footballers
Association football midfielders
Saba players
Rah Ahan players
Paykan F.C. players